The Yamaha D-1500 is a 1 U rack mountable monophonic digital delay unit with modulation. It was produced in 1984 in Japan. It was also the first digital delay unit to have a MIDI interface.

Sampling frequency
The sampling frequency is 20 Hz – 18 kHz

Memory
 1 second sampling time
 6 rom presets
 16 patches setups

Notable users
 Robin Guthrie
 Steve Vai

References

Sound recording technology
Effects units